Jeremy Attfield (born 5 March 1972) is an English first-class cricketer. He played in six matches for Oxford University Cricket Club in 1995.

See also
 List of Oxford University Cricket Club players

References

External links
 

1972 births
Living people
English cricketers
Oxford University cricketers
Sportspeople from Kettering
Alumni of Keble College, Oxford